Martin Hodgson (26 March 1909 – 23 July 1991) was an English rugby league footballer who played in the 1920s, 1930s and 1940s. Lauded as one of the game's greatest ever s, he represented Great Britain, England and Cumberland on many occasions. Hodgson played his entire club career with Swinton with whom he won two Championships. He toured Australasia in 1932 and 1936 with the Great Britain lions, and became the only British forward to appear in five Ashes-winning squads, between 1929 and 1937.

Biography
Martin Hodgson was born in Egremont, Cumberland, England, he worked in the heat treating department at David Brown Ltd. in Lockwood, Huddersfield, he was the landlord of The Unicorn public house (now demolished), Shambles Lane, Huddersfield , and he died aged 82 in Swinton, Greater Manchester, England.

Playing career
Hodgson signed for rugby league club Swinton aged 17 during January 1927, he became a goal-kicking  for Swinton, with whom he reached the final of the 1927 Lancashire Cup, playing in their victory over Wigan. He won caps for Great Britain while at Swinton in 1929-30 against Australia (2 matches), in 1932 against Australia (3 matches), New Zealand (3 matches), in 1933 against Australia (3 matches), in 1936 against Australia (3 matches), New Zealand, and in 1937 against Australia. Hodgsoon also won caps for England while at Swinton in 1928 against Wales, in 1929 against Other Nationalities, in 1932 against Wales, in 1935 against France, in 1936 against Wales (2 matches), France, in 1937 against France,

He was selected to go on the 1932 Great Britain Lions tour, playing as ad New Zealand. In 1931 Hodgson's Swinton side won the Championship. In 1935 Hodgson was again part of a Swinton Championship-winning side.

His goal kicking proved decisive in the third and deciding test. Arthur Atkinson of Castleford kicked a penalty goal from 75-yards in the 20-10 victory over St. Helens at Knowsley Road, St. Helens on Saturday 26 October 1929). Swinton reached the final of the 1940 Lancashire Cup, and Hodgson played in their victory over Widnes in the final.

After retirement
In 2005 Hodgson was inducted into the British Rugby League Hall of Fame.

References

External links
(archived by web.archive.org) Martin Hodgson at rugbyleaguehistory.co.uk

1909 births
1991 deaths
Cumberland rugby league team players
England national rugby league team captains
England national rugby league team players
English rugby league players
Great Britain national rugby league team players
Publicans
Rugby league players from Egremont, Cumbria
Rugby league second-rows
Swinton Lions players